René Toribio (born 10 December 1912 in Lamentin, Guadeloupe; died 27 July 1990 in the same town) was a French politician and was a member of the French Senate representing Guadeloupe from 1959 to 1968.

Biography
Before WWII he was a teacher and a headmaster. Active in the French Resistance, he was elected as mayor of his home town Lamentin in 1945. Two years later, as Guadeloupe had become a French department in 1946, he was also elected as the first conseiller général of the Lamantin Canton. He became a member of the French Section of the Workers' International in 1949 and rapidly emerged as one of its local leaders. He was elected its federal secretary for Guadeloupe until 1958.

He then presided in 1953-1956 the General Council of Guadeloupe. One year after an unsuccessful candidacy at the 1958 legislative election, he was elected in 1959 as a senator, thus holding three mandates simultaneously.

In five years time he lost his mandates of conseiller général (1967), of senator (1968), of mayor (1971), then quit his party in 1972 to form the Guadeloupean Socialist Party, a splinter of the French Socialist Party in reaction against the Programme commun signed by the PS with the French Communist Party. Under this new political label, he took part to the 1973 legislative election, but failed to be elected. He supported in 1974 the presidential candidacy of François Mitterrand, but never again joined the PS.

In 1989, he succeeded to regain his mayorship in Lamentin, but deceased the next year and was succeeded by his son José Toribio, who also became the new PSG's president.

Notes

References

1912 births
1990 deaths
People from Lamentin
Guadeloupean politicians
French Section of the Workers' International politicians
Socialist Party (France) politicians
French Senators of the Fifth Republic
Senators of Guadeloupe